List of mayors of Sandefjord, Norway:

References

Sources
 Berg, Knut (1984). Sandefjords historie – sett gjennem Sandefjords Blads spalter 1861-1983. Pages 773–776.
 Hoffstad, Arne (1976). Sandefjord – byen vår: Trekk fra Sandefjordsdistriktets historie under hvalfangsteventyret 1905-1968. Forf. ISBN 8299038413.
 Hougen, Knut (1932). Sandefjords historie 2. Cammermeyers Boghandel. Accessible through the National Library of Norway at https://urn.nb.no/URN:NBN:no-nb_digibok_2012060806092

Sandefjord
Sandefjord